Mouse Soup is a 1977 picture book by noted illustrator Arnold Lobel. Beginning with the simple sentence "A mouse sat under a tree", the book goes on to tell the story of a mouse who has to trick Weasel from turning Mouse into Mouse Soup. He does that by telling stories about Bees and the Mud, Two Large Stones, The Crickets, and The Thorn Bush, and tells Weasel to put them into his soup. It is then assumed that Mouse got away and Weasel got stung by bees.

Plot 
A male mouse leaves his house to sit under a tree to read a book. While he reads, a weasel suddenly captures him. The weasel then takes the mouse back to his home, thinking of making Mouse Soup with the mouse. Just as the weasel puts the mouse into the pot, the rodent tells the crafty weasel that the soup will not taste good without any stories in it at all. The weasel does feel hungry, but agrees to let the mouse tell him four stories that will go in the pot.

The Bees and the Mud

A mouse is walking along when a beehive falls on his head. He tries to reason with the bees to go away, but the bees decide to use his head as their new home. The mouse then comes up with a plan to submerge himself in a mud hole, claiming to the bees that it is his home. He keeps wading in deeper, describing each depth as a room in his house, but the bees approve and remain on his head. Finally, when the rodent submerges his head under the mud, passing it off as his bed, the bees finally decide they dislike his bed, and they go away, allowing the mouse to go home to take a bath.

Two Large Stones

Two large stones sit on a hill and wonder what's on the other side, as they can't move from the spot where they sit. When they ask a bird to check, the avian soon returns and tells them about buildings, cities, mountains, and valleys on the other side. The thought of not being able to see those things makes the stones sad. A hundred years soon pass and then a mouse passes by, and the stones ask him to check the other side of the hill. The rodent soon tells them that it is the same as the side the stones reside on. This make the stones feel glad that they're not missing anything, but wonder whether the mammal or the bird was right.

The Crickets 

In the third story, a cricket gets the urge to sing a song in the middle of the night. But his singing disturbs a female mouse, who is trying to get some sleep. Each time the lady mouse demands not to hear any more music, the cricket thinks she said she does want more music and so calls over a lot of friends. Soon, the crickets are making so much noise with their singing that the lady mouse simply shouts at them to go away, to which the cricket wonders why she didn't say so before. After the crickets go away, the mouse goes back to bed, although the newfound quietness proves to be a new distraction.

The Thorn Bush

In the fourth story, a mouse police officer comes to the home of an old and female mouse because she is crying. She shows him a thorn bush that is growing out of her chair. Initially the officer offers to dispose of it so the lady can sit again, but she explains she doesn't care about sitting, and she's crying because she loves the bush and it's dying. He advises her to throw some water on the thorn bush right away, which causes it to grow into a bunch of roses. To thank the officer, the old female mouse gives him both a kiss on the cheek and some of the roses as his payments.

After finishing his stories, the mouse tells the weasel to bring in the things that were associated with the stories: a bee's nest, some mud, two stones, ten crickets, and a thorn bush. The weasel leaves his house, without closing the door on the way out, allowing the mouse to escape and follow the weasel at a distance. The rodent then witnesses the predator suffering for his fool's errand. After getting stung by bees, gathering up wet sticky mud, struggling with two heavy stones, jumping to catch crickets, and getting pricked by a thorn bush, the weasel now thinks he'll have a tasty soup. Upon arriving home, the weasel, sees the empty pot, and realizes he's been tricked. The mouse, by this time, has safely returned to his own house and, after having some dinner, finishes reading his book.

Audio recording
In 1978, Scholastic Records issued a 7-inch 33 r.p.m. record (SCC 2807) of the author reading the story. It was directed by Bernice Chardiet, produced by Robert Mack, and contained music by Albert Hague.

Stop motion film
In 1992, the book was made into a 26-minute musical stop motion animated film by Churchill Films, directed by John Clark Matthews and starring Buddy Hackett as the voice of Mouse.

References

External links

1977 children's books
American children's books
American picture books
Children's books adapted into films
Books about mice and rats
Fictional weasels
Picture books by Arnold Lobel
Harper & Row books